Aflatoon (also Aflatun) or Aflatoun is the Arabic form of the name of the philosopher Plato (from Greek Πλάτων Plátōn) and has also popularly come to mean a smarty, a pompous or eccentric person or a maverick in Hindustani (Hindi-Urdu). It may refer to:
 Aflatoon (film), a 1997 Indian movie
 Aflatoun, a non-governmental organization headquartered in Amsterdam, Netherlands
 Aflatun, Kyrgyzstan